The Yomiuri Milers Cup (Japanese マイラーズカップ) is a Japanese Grade 2 flat horse race in Japan for Thoroughbreds of at least four years of age. It was run over a distance of 1600 metres at Hanshin Racecourse until 2011 in April but is now run at Kyoto Racecourse. The race serves as a major trial for the Yasuda Kinen.

The Milers Cup was first run in 1970 and was elevated to Grade 2 status in 1984.

Among the winners of the race have been Daiwa Major, Company, Grand Prix Boss and Isla Bonita.

Winners since 2000 

The 2021 and 2022 runnings took place at Hanshin while Kyoto was closed for redevelopment.

Earlier winners

See also
 Horse racing in Japan
 List of Japanese flat horse races

References

Turf races in Japan